Michael Tilson Thomas (born December 21, 1944) is an American conductor, pianist and composer. He is Artistic Director Laureate of the New World Symphony, an American orchestral academy based in Miami Beach, Florida, Music Director Laureate of the San Francisco Symphony, and Conductor Laureate of the London Symphony Orchestra.

Biography

Tilson Thomas was born in Los Angeles, California, to Ted and Roberta Thomas, a Broadway stage manager and a middle school history teacher, respectively. He is the grandson of noted Yiddish theater stars Boris and Bessie Thomashefsky, who performed in the Yiddish Theater District in Manhattan. The family talent goes back to Tilson Thomas's great-grandfather, Pincus, an actor and playwright, and before that to a long line of cantors; his father, Theodor Herzl Tomashefsky (Ted Thomas), was also a poet and painter.

He was an only child and musical prodigy. Tilson Thomas studied piano with John Crown and composition and conducting under Ingolf Dahl at the University of Southern California, where he graduated from the USC Thornton School of Music ’67 and MM ’76. As a student of Friedelind Wagner, Tilson Thomas was a Musical Assistant and Assistant Conductor at the Bayreuth Festival.

Tilson Thomas lives in San Francisco with his husband and partner of over 40 years, Joshua Robison. The couple married on November 2, 2014.  In March 2022, Tilson Thomas disclosed publicly for the first time that he had been diagnosed with an aggressive form of brain cancer, called glioblastoma multiforme.

Career

Tilson Thomas has conducted a wide variety of music and is a particular champion of modern American works. He is also renowned for his interpretation of the works of Gustav Mahler; he has recorded all nine Mahler symphonies and other major orchestral works with the San Francisco Symphony. These recordings have been released on the high-resolution audio format Super Audio CD on the San Francisco Symphony's own recording label. Tilson Thomas is also known as a premier interpreter of the works of Aaron Copland, Charles Ives, and Steve Reich.

A sampling of Tilson Thomas's own compositions include From the Diary of Anne Frank (1990), Shówa/Shoáh (1995, memorializing the fiftieth anniversary of the bombing of Hiroshima),  Poems of Emily Dickinson (2002) and Urban Legend (2002).

Tilson Thomas has also been devoted to music education. He leads a series of education programs titled Keeping Score which offers insight into the lives and works of great composers, and led a series of Young People's Concerts with the New York Philharmonic. Tilson Thomas founded the New World Symphony in Miami in 1987. Most recently, Tilson Thomas has led two incarnations of the YouTube Symphony Orchestra, which brings young musicians from around the world together for a week of music making and learning.

Tilson Thomas currently serves as president of the Tomashefsky Project, a $2 million undertaking formed in 2017 that is intended to record and preserve his grandparents' theatrical achievements, and is on the faculty of the University of Southern California Thornton School of Music.

Due to health concerns, Tilson Thomas announced on March 2, 2022, he will be stepping down as the Artistic Director of the New World Symphony and instead serve as the Artistic Director Laureate.

Boston, Buffalo, New York, and Los Angeles

From 1968 to 1994, Tilson Thomas was the Music Director of the Ojai Music Festival seven times. After winning the Koussevitzky Prize at Tanglewood in 1969, Tilson Thomas was named Assistant Conductor of the Boston Symphony Orchestra. That same year, he made his conducting debut with the Boston Symphony Orchestra, replacing an unwell William Steinberg mid-concert and thereby coming into international recognition at the age of 24. He stayed with the Boston Symphony as an assistant conductor until 1974 and made several recordings with the orchestra for Deutsche Grammophon. He was music director of the Buffalo Philharmonic Orchestra from 1971 to 1979, and recorded for Columbia Records with the orchestra. 

Between 1971 and 1977, he also conducted the series of Young People's Concerts with the New York Philharmonic as well as the Young Musicians Foundation Debut Orchestra based in Los Angeles. From 1981 to 1985, he was principal guest conductor of the Los Angeles Philharmonic Orchestra. During a 1985 performance of Mahler's Eighth Symphony at the Hollywood Bowl, a (police) helicopter flew over the venue, disrupting the concert. This is when Tilson Thomas famously stormed offstage in the middle of the performance.

In 2007, he returned to the Hollywood Bowl leading the Los Angeles Philharmonic again in the Mahler Eighth, announcing jokingly, "Now where were we?" He returned in 2013 with Mahler's Second Symphony, when another helicopter flew over the venue. He stopped the orchestra, but then resumed the performance.

New World and London

In 1987, Tilson Thomas founded the New World Symphony in Miami Beach, Florida, an orchestral academy for gifted young musicians whose stated mission is "to prepare highly-gifted graduates of distinguished music programs for leadership roles in orchestras and ensembles around the world." He is currently the academy's artistic director. He played an instrumental role in the development of the Frank Gehry-designed New World Center in Miami Beach, which opened in 2011.  (The two had personal history, with Gehry sometimes having baby-sat for Tilson Thomas back when both were growing up in Los Angeles.)  In March 2022, Tilson Thomas announced that he is to stand down as artistic director of the New World Symphony as of 1 June 2022.

From 1988 to 1995, Tilson Thomas was principal conductor of the London Symphony Orchestra (LSO), and recorded with them for such labels as Columbia (now Sony Classical), including the Symphony No. 3 of Mahler.  From 1995, he held the title of principal guest conductor with the LSO, and became conductor laureate in 2016.

San Francisco

Tilson Thomas became the San Francisco Symphony's 11th Music Director in 1995. He originally made his debut with the orchestra in January 1974 conducting Mahler's Symphony No. 9. During his first season with the San Francisco Symphony, Tilson Thomas included a work by an American composer on nearly every one of his programs, including the first performances ever by the orchestra of music by Lou Harrison, and culminated with "An American Festival," a two-week focus on American music. 

In June 2000, Tilson Thomas and the San Francisco Symphony presented a landmark 12-concert American Mavericks Festival, recognizing the innovative works of 20th century American composers. Additional season-ending festivals in Davies Symphony Hall have included explorations of the music of Wagner, Prokofiev, Mahler, Stravinsky, Beethoven and Weill, including semi-staged productions of Rimsky-Korsakov's opera-ballet Mlada, Beethoven's Fidelio, and Wagner's The Flying Dutchman.  

During his tenure, the orchestra began to issue recordings on its own SFS Media label. In October 2017, the orchestra announced that Tilson Thomas would conclude his tenure as its music director at the close of the 2019–2020 season, and subsequently take the title of music director laureate.

In April 2005, he conducted the Carnegie Hall premiere of The Thomashefskys: Music and Memories of a Life in the Yiddish Theater, partly as a tribute to his own grandparents.  Other American orchestras have since performed this production, including the Chicago Symphony Orchestra, Los Angeles Philharmonic, Boston Symphony Orchestra, Philadelphia Orchestra, New York Philharmonic, New World Symphony and San Francisco Symphony. It has also been recorded for future broadcast on PBS.

Tilson Thomas collaborated with YouTube in 2009 to help create the YouTube Symphony Orchestra, an orchestra whose members were selected from 30 countries based on more than 3,000 video auditions on YouTube. The Orchestra, as well as such soloists as Mason Bates, Measha Brueggergosman, Joshua Roman, Gil Shaham, Yuja Wang, and Jess Larsen, and participated in a classical music summit in New York City at the Juilliard School over three days. The event culminated in a live concert at Carnegie Hall on Wednesday, April 15. The concert was later made available on YouTube. On March 20, 2011, Tilson Thomas also conducted the "YTSO2" (YouTube Symphony Orchestra 2) in Sydney.

Film and TV

His first television appearances were in the Young People's Concerts with the New York Philharmonic, airing from 1971 to 1977. He has also made regular appearances on PBS, with broadcasts featuring Tilson Thomas airing from 1972 through 2008. Eight episodes of WNET's Great Performances series have featured Tilson Thomas. He has also been featured on Japan's NHK and the BBC many times in the last three decades.

In 1976, Tilson Thomas appeared alongside Bugs Bunny and Daffy Duck in a prime-time special, Bugs and Daffy's Carnival of the Animals, a combined live action/animated broadcast of The Carnival of the Animals by Saint-Saëns.

In 2011 he hosted a concert stage show celebrating his grandparents and the music of American Yiddish theatre The Thomashefskys: Music and Memories of a Life in the Yiddish Theater, which aired in 2012 on the PBS series "Great Performances."

Tilson Thomas hosted the Keeping Score television series, nine one-hour documentary-style episodes and eight live-concert programs, which began airing nationally on PBS stations in early November 2006. He and the San Francisco Symphony have examined the lives and music of Gustav Mahler, Dmitri Shostakovich, Charles Ives, Hector Berlioz, Aaron Copland, Igor Stravinsky, Peter Ilyich Tchaikovsky, and Ludwig van Beethoven.

Keeping Score discography
 Tchaikovsky's 4th Symphony – 2004
 Beethoven's Eroica – 2006
 Copland and the American Sound – 2006
 Stravinsky's Rite of Spring – 2006
 Berlioz's Symphonie fantastique – 2009
 Shostakovich's Symphony No. 5 – 2009
 Ives' Holiday Symphony – 2009
 Mahler: Origins and Legacy – 2011

Partial discography
Tilson Thomas has made more than 120 recordings, including works by Bach, Mahler, Beethoven, Prokofiev and Stravinsky as well as his pioneering work with the music of Charles Ives, Carl Ruggles, Steve Reich, John Cage, Ingolf Dahl, Morton Feldman, George Gershwin, John McLaughlin and Elvis Costello. He has recorded the complete orchestral works of Gustav Mahler with the San Francisco Symphony.

List of compositions

Orchestra 

 From the Diary of Anne Frank (1990) for narrator and orchestra
 Shówa/Shoáh (1995)
 Agnegram (1998)
 Whitman Songs (1999) for vocal baritone and orchestra
 Poems of Emily Dickinson (2002) for vocal soprano and orchestra
 Urban Legend (2002) for contrabassoon and orchestra
 Four Preludes on Playthings of the Wind (2016) for mezzo-soprano, 2 female back-up singers, chamber orchestra, and bar band
 Meditations on Rilke (2019) for mezzo-soprano, baritone, and orchestra

Chamber ensemble 

 Street Song for Symphonic Brass (1988) for 3 C trumpets, B-flat flugelhorn, 4 horns in F, 2 trombones, bass trombone, and tuba
 Street Song for Brass Quintet (1988) for brass quintet
 Five Songs (1988) for vocal baritone and piano
 Grace (1993) for vocal soprano
 Fame, from Poems of Emily Dickinson (2001)
 Island Music (2003) for 2 solo marimba, 2 tutti marimba, and 2 percussion
 Notturno (2005) for flute and string quintet + harp (also available for flute and piano)
 Stay Together (2006) for electronics

Awards
Grammy Award for Best Classical Compendium
 2021 Conducting San Francisco Symphony, performing From the Diary of Anne Frank & Meditations on Rilke

Grammy Award for Best Orchestral Performance
2013 Conducting San Francisco Symphony, performing Adams: Harmonielehre & Short Ride in a Fast Machine
2006 Conducting San Francisco Symphony, performing Mahler: Symphony No. 7.2003 Conducting the San Francisco Symphony, performing Mahler: Symphony No. 6.2000 Conducting the Ragazzi, the Peninsula Boys Chorus, the San Francisco Girls Chorus, the San Francisco Symphony and Chorus, performing Stravinsky: The Firebird; The Rite of Spring; Perséphone.
1997 Conducting the San Francisco Symphony, performing Prokofiev: Romeo and Juliet (scenes).

Grammy Award for Best Classical Album
2010 Conducting San Francisco Symphony, performing Mahler: Symphony No. 8.2006 Conducting San Francisco Symphony, performing Mahler: Symphony No. 7.2004 Conducting San Francisco Symphony, performing Mahler: Symphony No. 3, Kindertotenlieder.
2000 Conducting the Ragazzi, the Peninsula Boy Chorus, the San Francisco Girls Chorus, the San Francisco Symphony and Chorus, performing Stravinsky: The Firebird; The Rite of Spring; Perséphone.

Grammy Award for Best Choral Performance
2010 Conducting San Francisco Symphony, performing Mahler: Symphony No. 8.
1976 Conducting the Cleveland Boys Choir and Cleveland Orchestra Chorus, performing Orff: Carmina Burana.

Peabody Award
2007 The MTT Files produced by Tom Voegeli and American Public Media.

National Medal of Arts
 2009 National Medal of Arts.

Kennedy Center Honor
 2019 Kennedy Center Honor was presented December 8, 2019.

See also
San Francisco Symphony
San Francisco Symphony Chorus
New World Symphony Orchestra

References

External links

1944 births
San Francisco Symphony
20th-century American conductors (music)
21st-century American conductors (music)
20th-century classical composers
American classical pianists
American male classical pianists
American male classical composers
American classical composers
American male conductors (music)
Grammy Award winners
Jewish classical pianists
Jewish American classical composers
American gay musicians
LGBT classical composers
Gay Jews
Gay composers
LGBT classical musicians
LGBT people from the San Francisco Bay Area
Living people
American music educators
Musicians from Los Angeles
USC Thornton School of Music alumni
London Symphony Orchestra principal conductors
United States National Medal of Arts recipients
21st-century American composers
20th-century American composers
20th-century American pianists
20th-century American LGBT people
21st-century American LGBT people
Kennedy Center honorees